Bulgarica is a genus of air-breathing land snails, terrestrial pulmonate gastropod mollusks in the family Clausiliidae, the door snails.

Species 
Species within the genus Bulgarica include:

 Bulgarica cana
 Bulgarica denticulata (Olivier, 1801)
 Bulgarica nitidosa
 Bulgarica varnensis (Pfeiffer, 1848) - type species

References

External links 

Clausiliidae